Julien Maio (born 6 May 1994) is a French badminton player. He started playing badminton at CEBA club in Strasbourg. He won the bronze medal at the 2013 European Junior Championships in the boys' doubles event, and silver medal in mixed team event. He claimed his first international title at the 2015 Eurasia Bulgaria International in the men's doubles partnered with Jordan Corvée. Maio was three times National champions winning in 2017–2019.

Achievements

European Junior Championships 
Boys' doubles

BWF International Challenge/Series (5 titles, 3 runners-up) 
Men's doubles

  BWF International Challenge tournament
  BWF International Series tournament
  BWF Future Series tournament

References

External links 
 

1994 births
Living people
Sportspeople from Strasbourg
French male badminton players
21st-century French people